K. C. Wolf is the official mascot of the National Football League's Kansas City Chiefs. He was first introduced in 1989 as a successor to Warpaint, a horse ridden by a man wearing a full Indian chief headdress, from the mid-1980s. K. C. Wolf was named after the team's "Wolfpack,” a group of boisterous fans who sat in temporary bleachers at Municipal Stadium.

In addition to football-related mascot duties, K. C. Wolf also appears at major and minor league baseball games, community activities, conventions, grand openings, parades, and other events. In the inaugural class of 2006, he was inducted into the Mascot Hall of Fame.  

K. C. Wolf has been portrayed by Dan Meers since the mascot's inception, and he acts as a motivational speaker at special events.

During the 2001 Pro Bowl, Meers tackled a drunk fan who had wandered onto the field and kept him restrained until security arrived. 

On September 23, 2007, Meers aided security guards in taking down a fan who had come on the field. He followed with a display of bodybuilding poses.

On November 23, 2013, Meers suffered spinal injuries while practicing a stunt.

References

External links 

Information about K. C. Wolf

Kansas City Chiefs
National Football League mascots
Canine mascots